Virbia trigonifera is a moth in the family Erebidae first described by William Schaus in 1901. It is found in Mexico.

References

trigonifera
Moths described in 1901